The 2004–05 season of the NOFV-Oberliga was the eleventh season of the league at tier four (IV) of the German football league system.

The NOFV-Oberliga was split into two divisions, NOFV-Oberliga Nord and NOFV-Oberliga Süd. The northern champions, F.C. Hansa Rostock II, decided against taking part in the playoffs for the right to play in the 2005–06 Regionalliga Nord, so MSV Neuruppin took their place against southern champions FC Carl Zeiss Jena. FC Carl Zeiss Jena won 4–1 over two legs and thus gained promotion.

North

Top goalscorers

South

Top goalscorers

External links 
 NOFV-Online – official website of the North-East German Football Association 

NOFV-Oberliga seasons
4
Germ